The State University of New York at Oneonta, also known as SUNY Oneonta, is a public university in Oneonta, New York. It is part of the State University of New York (SUNY) system.

History
SUNY Oneonta was established in 1889 as the Oneonta Normal School, as part of founding normal schools across the state to train teachers and expand public education. It was located in a building nicknamed "Old Main" at the top of Maple Street in the city of Oneonta. The school's first principal was James M. Milne, for whom the college's current library is named. For nearly 40 years, Old Main was the only building on campus, until 1933 when Bugbee School was built. Named after Percy I. Bugbee, the second principal of the Oneonta Normal School, Bugbee School provided an on-campus training facility for the student teachers attending the normal school.

In 1948, the college became a founding member of the State University of New York system, and the Oneonta Normal School was officially renamed the State University College of Education in 1951. Royal F. Netzer was the college's president from 1951 to 1970, presiding over a period of tremendous growth. The three joined buildings known as the Morris Conference Complex were the first ones erected on the current campus. The cornerstone of the current building was laid in 1950, with one wing being completed in February 1951 and the other in September 1951. The two wings, Bacon and Denison Halls, were originally used as dormitories, which were much needed on the rapidly expanding campus.

This was the site for development of today's  College Camp, which provides educational, recreational and social opportunities for the college community.

Home economics programs were added to the college's teacher education programs. In 1954, a Home Economics building and heating plant were constructed on the upper campus. These were followed in 1958 with the construction of a women's dormitory, Wilber Hall, followed by Tobey Hall in 1959.

The 1960s were a period of rapid growth in the college's operating budget, student enrollment, number of staff members, and the campus buildings. To alleviate the shortage of classrooms, 10 mobile classrooms were brought in as a temporary solution. Additional property was acquired to the north and west of the campus, providing two entrances from West Street, one near a new service building.

The first library on the upper campus was built in what is today's Alumni Hall. Other new buildings on the upper campus included a dorm, Littell Hall; a cafeteria (Lee Hall) and the Chase Physical Fitness Center. A path connected the upper campus with Old Main, which was slowly being phased out as the main academic building.

In fall 1963, the college started accepting transfer students into 13 liberal arts programs, beginning the transition to a multi-purpose higher education institution.

In 1964, a men's dormitory (Golding Hall) and the first science building, known as Science I, were built. These were followed in 1966 with the construction of four administration and class buildings (Mills Dining Hall, Schumacher, Netzer and Hodgdon Instructional Resource Center), five dormitories (Ford, Grant, Hays, Huntington and Sherman halls) and the health center.

The late 1960s were a period of rapid faculty turnover. Between 1966 and 1970, there were 205 faculty resignations, retirements or contract terminations. With 35 or 40 new positions each year, the number of new faculty members increased from 35 in 1963 to 80 or more from 1966 to 1970. With the rapid growth in the number of faculty, the college's four major academic departments began to split into separate departments. The Department of English, Speech and Theater, which also included Foreign Languages, was the first to subdivide in 1969 into three departments: English, Speech and Theater, and Foreign Languages. In 1970, the Science Department split into separate departments of Biology, Chemistry, Earth Science, Physics and Science Education, and the Social Science Department split into six separate departments.

By the early 1970s, several more new buildings had been constructed, including academic facilities (Fitzelle Hall, Fine Arts, Science II and the current Milne Library), Wilsbach Dining Hall, five dormitories (Matteston, MacDuff, Curtis, Blodgett and Hulbert halls) and the Hunt College Union, named for Charles W. Hunt, who served as the school's principal/president from 1933 to 1951.

A field station on Otsego Lake in Cooperstown, New York was also completed, stimulated by a gift of and additional . The new building housed an environmental laboratory facility for the Biology Department. It also held the new graduate program in the Conservation of Historic and Artistic Objects, the forerunner to today's Cooperstown Graduate Program in museum studies.

Between 1972 and 1980, teacher education enrollments declined dramatically, while liberal arts enrollments increased. The 1970s were a decade of state budget problems and declining enrollments. Clifford Craven led the college as president from 1970 to 1987.

The historic Old Main building was torn down in 1977, and in 1981, two pillars from the building were installed on a hill overlooking the SUNY Oneonta campus as a reminder of the college's history. Today, they are part of a campus tradition for new and graduating students called "Pass Through the Pillars."

In 1982, the college at Oneonta Foundation was formed with the mission of raising and administering gifts and grants to enhance the academic status of the college through endowment, scholarships and institutional programs. Alan B. Donovan served as college president from 1988 to 2008. Accomplishments during his tenure included advancements in technology, including Internet access; a more competitive admissions process, expanded multicultural programs and increased financial stability. The college's endowment grew from $1.9 million when Donovan joined SUNY Oneonta in 1988, to $30 million when he left.

Challenges during Donovan's era included student violence in downtown Oneonta and racial tension on campus. The college made national news in Fall 1992 during an incident known as the "Black List." On the morning of September 4, 1992, a 77-year-old woman told police she was attacked at the home of a family she was visiting outside the town of Oneonta. She concluded her assailant was black, by seeing only his hand. Police officers believed that blood at the scene indicated the assailant suffered a cut on his hand from a knife he had wielded. College officials provided New York State Police a list of 78 black and Latino male students to aid in the investigation, provoking outrage and national attention. In the following days, police questioned hundreds of African Americans in the area, stopping them, and checking their hands for signs of wounds. Many members of the black community of Oneonta were stopped multiple times over several days. The perpetrator was never found. In 2012, SUNY Oneonta President Nancy Kleniewski announced the formation of the September 4 Commemoration Committee to develop programming to mark and remember what she termed a "low point" in the school's history.

In the 1990s SUNY Oneonta extended its commitments to community partnership, founding the Center for Economic and Community Development, and the Center for Social Responsibility and Community. Several construction projects were completed under Donovan, including the Alumni Field House in 1998 and the Robin Ross Higgins Hall in 2003. A  $10 million renovation to the Human Ecology facilities was also completed in 2003.

In 2008, Nancy Kleniewski began her tenure as SUNY Oneonta's seventh president. In 2009, she convened the Strategic Planning and Resource Council, composed of faculty, staff, students, alumni and community members and charged with developing a strategic plan to help define the college's future.

In fall 2013, SUNY Oneonta reorganized, founding five new schools—Economics and Business, Arts and Humanities, Social Science, Natural and Mathematical Sciences, and Education and Human Biology—to give greater focus to disciplines and careers in those areas.

President Barbara Jean Morris came to SUNY Oneonta in July 2018 from her position as provost and vice president for academic affairs at Fort Lewis College. Through a listening tour late in the summer of 2018 and a series of hackathon-type events in spring 2019, President Morris established a new mission statement for SUNY Oneonta, "We nurture a community where students grow intellectually, thrive socially and live purposefully".

Dennis Craig was hired as an interim president in October 2020 following the departure of Dr. Morris. He held the position until Alberto J.F. Cardelle was named as president of SUNY Oneonta. His appointment began on September 6, 2021.

Academics 
SUNY Oneonta enrolls about 5,500 students who pursue bachelor's or master's degrees or certificates in one of 60-plus academic programs.

Accreditations 
The Middle States Commission on Higher Education accredits the college. The Association to Advance Collegiate Schools of Business accredits the college's business programs. The American Association of Family and Consumer Sciences accredits the undergraduate programs offered by SUNY Oneonta's Human Ecology Department. The Accreditation Council for Education in Nutrition and Dietetics accredits the undergraduate Dietetics program. The National Council for Accreditation of Teacher Education accredits the college's education programs. The National Association of Schools of Music accredits the programs offered by the Music Department. The National Association of Schools of Theatre accredits the programs offered by the Theatre Department.

Experiential learning 

SUNY Oneonta offers semester- and year-long study abroad and exchange programs through the Office of Global Education. Students also participate in a short-term faculty-led field course. These trips are usually part of a semester-long or summer course and typically last 10 days to three weeks, offering hands-on learning in a student's field of study.

Connections with Oneonta alumni through programs such as the annual Backpacks to Briefcases networking event for business students help students land internships further afield, and many of these opportunities lead to full-time employment after graduation.

Students have collaborated with faculty on a variety of research topics, including a green chemistry invention that won a United States patent. Students also do independent research on topics of their own choosing, guided by faculty mentors, and present them at SUNY Oneonta's annual Student Research & Creative Activity Day on campus. Grant awards are available for independent research and creative activity projects conducted by students with faculty sponsorship in any discipline or interdisciplinary area.

Many students also present their research at regional and national conferences, and funding is available to help defray travel expenses through the Caroline '67 and David D’Antonio Undergraduate Student Travel for Excellence Fund and the Student Travel for Excellence Program.

Notable facilities 

The planetarium is used in a variety of science classes across campus, and offers a fun and enriching experience for all students. 

The Science Discovery Center is a science center open to students and the public, and offers a variety of educational activities. 

The SUNY Oneonta College Observatory is the largest optical telescope in New York State, one that is believed to be one of the largest telescopes open for public observing east of the Mississippi.

The camp comprises various types of forest that warrant various management techniques. In winter 2012-13 the Camp was surveyed by a state forester from the New York State Department of Environmental Conservation (NYSDEC) who compiled a complete analysis, description, and recommended management plan for the property.

Notable faculty
Blake Fleming – founder of The Mars Volta and Dazzling Killmen, drum instructor
Jeremy Wall – founder of jazz fusion group Spyro Gyra, various music classes

Honor societies

Active chapters 
 Alpha Psi Omega (ΑΨΟ; Theater)
 Beta Beta Beta (ΒΒΒ, Biology)
 Beta Gamma Sigma (ΒΓΣ, Business programs accredited by AACSB International)
 Chi Alpha Epsilon (ΧΑΕ; Special Programs)
 Chi Alpha Sigma (ΧΑΣ; Student Athletes)
 Gamma Theta Upsilon (ΓΘΥ; Geography)
 Kappa Delta Pi (ΚΔΠ; Elementary Education)
 Lambda Pi Eta (ΛΠΗ; Communications)
 National Residence Hall Honorary (Residential Community Life)
 Omicron Delta Epsilon (ΟΔΕ; Economics)
 Omicron Delta Kappa (ΟΔΚ; Leadership)
 Phi Alpha Theta (ΦΑΘ; History)
 Phi Eta Sigma (ΦΗΣ; Freshman Honors)
 Phi Sigma Iota (ΦΣΙ; Foreign Languages)
 Phi Sigma Tau (ΦΣΤ;Philosophy)
 Phi Upsilon Omicron (ΦΥΟ; Human Ecology)
 Pi Sigma Alpha (ΠΣΑ; Political Science)
 Psi Chi (ΨΧ; Psychology)
 Sigma Gamma Epsilon (ΣΓΕ; Earth Science)
 Sigma Pi Sigma (ΣΠΣ; Physics)
 Sigma Tau Delta (ΣΤΔ; English)
 Tau Kappa Epsilon (TKE)

Inactive chapters 

Alpha Kappa Delta (ΑΚΔ; Sociology)
Sigma Xi (Scientific Research)

Conferences

SUNY Oneonta Undergraduate Political Science Conference
The SUNY Oneonta Undergraduate Political Science Conference is a tradition hosted by the Oneonta Political Science Club and the Political Science Department. The first conference was hosted March 20–21, 2009. The keynote speaker for that year was Alan Chartock, Professor Emeritus at SUNY Albany and host of The Capitol Connection.

SUNY Oneonta Undergraduate Philosophy Conference
The SUNY Oneonta Undergraduate Philosophy Conference is an annual conference. First conceived in 1995 under the supervision of the late Douglas Shrader, Distinguished Teaching Professor of Philosophy at SUNY Oneonta, the event is sponsored by the college's Philosophy Club and organized by a student Conference Committee.

SUNY Oneonta New Critics Undergraduate Literature and Composition Conference
The SUNY Oneonta New Critics Undergraduate Literature and Composition Conference is hosted each spring by the English Department.

PRISM Conference
SUNY Oneonta hosts the PRISM Conference, previously the SUNY Pride conference.

Student life

Campus living 
Over 3,000 students live in SUNY Oneonta's 15 residence halls, which offer living arrangements ranging from doubles to apartments. 
Dining services at SUNY Oneonta are offered by Sodexo, and the college's residential dining halls were the first in the country designed specifically for Sodexo's Campus Crossroads program.  Dining plans are unlimited and offer options for additional dollars for purchases at cafes and other retail facilities on campus.

Clubs and organizations
SUNY Oneonta offers students over 150 clubs and organizations that supports a wide variety of interests.

WIRE TV
WIRE TV (Campus Channel 73, Time Warner Channel 23) is SUNY Oneonta's student-run television station. The station produces over 4 hours of original programming each week, in addition to Live Sporting events.

WONY
WONY 90.9 FM is SUNY Oneonta's student-run radio station. It was founded in 1962 and broadcasts both online and through physical radio, and is active 24/7.

Athletics

The Oneonta Red Dragons athletics program represent SUNY Oneonta, State University of New York. The school's team currently competes at the Division III level in the State University of New York Athletic Conference, and has been since the conference's inception in 1958. Oneonta's athletic teams also compete in the Eastern College Athletic Conference. The school facilities include Dewar Arena in the Alumni Field House, All College Field, Chase Athletic Building, and Red Dragon Soccer, Baseball and Softball fields.

Notable people

Alumni 
Marty Appel – author, public relations official, New York Yankees.
Bruce Avolio – academic and psychologist
Oluwale Bamgbose – professional mixed martial artist, formerly competing in the UFC's middleweight division
Jennifer Bernet -  member of the New Hampshire House of Representatives
Edward Burns – actor, director.
Scott Coffel - poet
 Roy Freiman (born 1959), politician who has represented the 16th Legislative District in the New Jersey General Assembly since 2018.
Ron Garan - NASA astronaut
Don Garber – Major League Soccer commissioner.
Henry Glassie - author and professor
Victoria Graffeo – associate judge of the New York Court of Appeals
Judy Griffin - New York State Assemblywoman, author
Kaitlyn Herman – contestant, Big Brother 20 (American season)
Robin Higgins – Under Secretary for Memorial Affairs (ret.), U.S. Department of Veterans Affairs 
Joe Howarth – played professionally in the American Soccer League and Major Indoor Soccer League.
Amy Ignatow – author and illustrator of the Popularity Papers series of children's books.
Mary Isaacson - member of the Pennsylvania House of Representatives
Jingyu Lin - inventor of the MicroLED
Lori Lite - author
Ian Travis MacMillan – author, creative writing professor at University of Hawaii.
Matt McGinley, drummer, co-founder of Gym Class Heroes.
Roy McDonald – New York Senator
Andy McKean – Iowa representative
Tim Melia - goalkeeper, Sporting Kansas City
Jim Neu - playwright
Sal Paolantonio – ESPN NFL reporter
 Antonio Pérez (born 1946), New York City educator
Bill Pullman – Actor, Director, Producer
Farrukh Quraishi – Hermann Trophy winning, former professional soccer player and executive
Stephen Rannazzisi – Actor, comedian. The League, TV Show.
Ron Sanchez - Head coach of the Charlotte 49ers men's basketball team
Al Schnier  – musician guitarist for the American jam band moe. 
Dermot Shea - 44th Police Commissioner of New York City 
John W. Sidgmore - corporate executive 
Jack Smith - Special Counsel for the United States Department of Justice
Elaine Sortino - former University of Massachusetts Amherst softball coach 
John Stein - academic 
Caryl M. Stern - author and activist 
Travis Stone - horse racing announcer 
Linda Swartz Taglialatela - United States Ambassador to Grenada, Saint Kitts and Nevis, Antingua and Barbuda, Saint Vincent and the Grenadines, Saint Lucia, Dominica, and Barbados, Special Representative to the Organisation of Eastern Caribbean States 
George William Thompson - author, attorney, and professor 
Keith Tozer – former Milwaukee Wave (MISL) head coach.
Chris Wade - mixed martial artist
Roger Watkins – film director and actor
Jessamine S. Whitney – statistician, National Tuberculosis Association
Marian Young, biologist

Faculty 
Blake Fleming – founder of The Mars Volta and Dazzling Killmen, drum instructor
Jeremy Wall – founder of jazz fusion group Spyro Gyra, various music classes

References

External links

 Official website
 Official athletics website

 
Oneonta
Oneonta
Universities and colleges in Otsego County, New York